All That's Good is the fifth album by American organist Freddie Roach recorded in 1964 and released on the Blue Note label. It was reissued on CD only in Japan, as a limited edition.

Reception

The Allmusic review by Stephen Thomas Erlewine awarded the album 2 stars and stated "On his final album for Blue Note, Freddie Roach decided to step outside -- way outside -- the tasteful soul-jazz that had become his trademark. Roach decided to make a concept album, one that captured the sound and vibe of what he calls "Soultown," or what critics like to call "black culture." .... Roach never hits upon a groove, choosing to create a series of bizarre, hazy textures. That atmosphere is catapulted into the realms of the surreal by vocalists Phyllis Smith, Willie Tate, and Marvin Robinson, whose wordless, floating singing sounds spectral; the intent may have been to mimic a gospel choir, but the effect is that of a pack of banshees wailing in the background....in a weird way, it's almost fortunate that Roach attempted something grand, because All That's Good sounds like no other Blue Note record of the early '60s".

Track listing
All compositions by Freddie Roach except as noted
 "Journeyman" - 7:38
 "All That's Good" - 6:23
 "Blues for 007" - 5:51
 "Busted" (Harlan Howard) - 6:04
 "Cloud 788" - 6:25
 "Loie" (Kenny Burrell) - 6:34

Personnel
Freddie Roach - organ
Conrad Lester - tenor saxophone
Calvin Newborn - guitar
Clarence Johnston - drums
Marvin Robinson, Phyllis Smith, Willie Tate - vocals

References

Blue Note Records albums
Freddie Roach (organist) albums
1965 albums
Albums recorded at Van Gelder Studio
Albums produced by Alfred Lion